Eduard Wolffhardt is a former Austrian slalom canoeist who competed from the mid-1970s to the mid-1980s. He won three silver medals at the ICF Canoe Slalom World Championships, earning them in 1977 (K-1 team) and 1979 (K-1, K-1 team).

References

Austrian male canoeists
Living people
Year of birth missing (living people)
Medalists at the ICF Canoe Slalom World Championships